Tormod Kåre Knutsen (7 January 1932 – 23 February 2021) was a Norwegian Nordic combined skier, who won the Nordic combined event at the 1964 Winter Olympics, and came second at the 1960 Winter Olympics. He won four national championships, and in 1960, he received the Norwegian Holmenkollen Medal.

Sports career

Knutsen started as a ski jumper, winning the national junior titles in 1949 and 1951. He failed to qualify for the 1952 Winter Olympics in Oslo, after which he considered taking up Nordic combined skiing. Whilst completing military service, he met Nordic combined skiers Gunder Gundersen and Sverre Stenersen, who encouraged him to take up the event. Knutsen won a bronze medal in the Nordic combined event at the 1955 national championships. He was selected for the 1956 Winter Olympics as a substitute, and was included to the main team two days before the event due to an injury of Gunder Gundersen; Knutsen placed sixth. He was the third best placed Norwegian in the event, behind Stenersen and Arne Barhaugen.

In 1958, Knutsen won Nordic combined in the Holmenkollen Ski Festival; he was the only Norwegian to win an event. That year, he also came 9th at the FIS Nordic World Ski Championships 1958. He won the national titles in 1959 and 1960. In 1960, he also placed second in ski jumping at the national championships. He was a favourite for the Nordic combined event at the 1960 Winter Olympics, and finished second to Georg Thoma. After placing fourth at the FIS Nordic World Ski Championships 1962, he won the national title in 1963 and 1964. Knutsen won a gold medal in the Nordic combined event at the 1964 Winter Olympics in Innsbruck, Austria. He had been in second place, behind Thoma, after the ski jumping phase of the event. It was Norway's first gold medal of the Games. Later in the year, Knutsen finished sixth at the Holmenkollen Ski Festival, and he retired at the end of the 1964 season. In 1964, he wrote an autobiography I hopp og løype (In jumps and trails).

Awards
Knutsen received the Holmenkollen Medal in 1960, shared with Helmut Recknagel, Sixten Jernberg and Sverre Stensheim.

Personal life
Knutsen was born in Eidsvoll on 7 January 1932. He represented the club Eidsvold Værks Skiklub.

He died in Eidsvoll on 23 February 2021. His death was announced by his son Audun Knutsen.

Nordic combined results
Results are sourced from the International Ski Federation (FIS), unless indicated otherwise.

Olympic Games

World Championship

References

External links

Holmenkollen medalists - click Holmenkollmedaljen for downloadable pdf file 
Holmenkollen winners since 1892 - click Vinnere for downloadable pdf file 

1932 births
2021 deaths
People from Eidsvoll
Nordic combined skiers at the 1956 Winter Olympics
Nordic combined skiers at the 1960 Winter Olympics
Nordic combined skiers at the 1964 Winter Olympics
Holmenkollen medalists
Holmenkollen Ski Festival winners
Norwegian male Nordic combined skiers
Olympic Nordic combined skiers of Norway
Olympic medalists in Nordic combined
Medalists at the 1960 Winter Olympics
Medalists at the 1964 Winter Olympics
Olympic gold medalists for Norway
Olympic silver medalists for Norway
Norwegian autobiographers